The Second Masol government was created after the Ukrainian parliament had ousted the previous Cabinet of Leonid Kuchma on September 21, 1993. After Kuchma's dismissal the President of Ukraine Leonid Kravchuk took over the control of cabinet for almost a year. 

On June 16, 1994, only 199 deputies voted for the appointment of Vitaliy Masol who headed the cabinet before and was ousted as result of intense student's protests known as the "Revolution on Granite". Masol's new government was Ukraine's third since Ukraine gained its independence in August 1991. Note that not all members of the Cabinet were ministers.

On April 4, 1995, the Cabinet was dismissed due to the vote of no confidence resolution adopted by the Supreme Council of Ukraine.

Existing members

Composition

References

Ukrainian governments
1993 establishments in Ukraine
1995 disestablishments in Ukraine
Cabinets established in 1993
Cabinets disestablished in 1995